Saint-Ondras is a commune in the Isère department in southeastern France.

Population

Geography
The Bourbre forms the commune's northwestern border.

See also
Communes of the Isère department

References

Communes of Isère
Isère communes articles needing translation from French Wikipedia